Jordi Gómez García-Penche (born 24 May 1985) is a Spanish professional footballer who plays as a central midfielder for PAC Omonia 29M.

After playing for the reserve teams of both Barcelona and Espanyol, he went on to spend the vast majority of his career in England, mainly with Wigan Athletic, with whom he won the FA Cup in 2013.

Club career

Early years
Born in Barcelona, Catalonia, Gómez emerged through Barcelona's youth ranks, and played once for the first team in competitive games, coming on for Thiago Motta in the 68th minute of a 6–0 win against Zamora in the Copa del Rey, on 11 January 2006.

Gómez completed his formation with neighbours Espanyol, and made his official debut with the latter in a 4–0 away defeat to Real Murcia on 23 March 2008. He appeared in a further two La Liga matches during his tenure, always as a second-half substitute.

Swansea City
On 6 June 2008, Gómez signed for Swansea City of the Football League Championship on a season-long loan, for a fee of £200,000; teammate Albert Serrán also made the move, albeit in a permanent situation. He scored the winning goal with a deflected free kick against rivals Cardiff City on 23 September, in the first South Wales derby for seven years.

Gómez was described by scouts as having "a lovely ability to receive the ball in space or if he is marked tightly, find space after his first touch". Whilst on loan, reports surfaced that Swansea wanted to sign him permanently and other teams were supposedly interested in acquiring his services, but nothing came of it, as manager Roberto Martínez eventually announced the club would not be able to retain the player due to his high price tag.

Wigan Athletic
Gómez finished the season with 14 goals in all competitions and returned to Espanyol, being immediately sold to Premier League side Wigan Athletic on a three-year contract on 19 June 2009, with the transfer fee estimated to be in the region of £1.7 million – the move also meant he would be reunited with former Swansea boss, countryman Martínez. He made his debut in a 2–0 victory over Aston Villa on 15 August, and netted his first goal for the club against Birmingham City on 5 December, albeit in a 2–3 home loss.

Gómez scored his second league goal in a 2–0 defeat of Wolverhampton Wanderers on 2 October 2010. However, during the match, he escaped suffering a leg injury after a challenge from Karl Henry.

On 17 December 2011, Gómez scored the equaliser for the hosts in a 1–1 draw against Chelsea, his fourth goal in five league games. He netted the second goal at Arsenal in the eighth minute of an eventual 2–1 away win on 16 April 2012 at the Emirates Stadium, and the Latics once again managed to avoid relegation.

On 28 August 2012, Gómez scored once as Wigan defeated Nottingham Forest 4–1 away to reach the third round of the Football League Cup. On 24 November he netted a hat-trick to help his club win 3–2 at home against Reading at the DW Stadium, becoming just the second Spaniard to achieve the feat in the Premier League after Fernando Torres.

On 9 March 2013, Gómez provided the cross from which Maynor Figueroa opened the scoring at Everton, and he himself added the final 3–0 for his team's third goal in as many minutes, in an eventual qualification to the semi-finals of the FA Cup. He helped them win the competition, being replaced after 81 minutes by Ben Watson, who went on to score the winning goal; however, only three days later, with him on the pitch again, the side were relegated from the top division following a 1–4 away defeat to Arsenal.

Gómez remained at Wigan for their first season back in the Championship, and also took part in the club's inaugural campaign in the UEFA Europa League. On 12 December 2013, in the last group stage match, he scored a penalty kick to put his team ahead at Maribor, but the Slovene ultimately won 2–1.

Sunderland
On 29 May 2014, Gómez signed a three-year deal with Sunderland on a free transfer after his contract at Wigan expired. He made his debut on 16 August, coming on as a 68th-minute substitute for Jack Rodwell in a 2–2 draw away to West Bromwich Albion, and scored his first goal 11 days later August in a 3–0 League Cup second round victory at Birmingham City.

Gómez scored his first league goal for his new team on 3 November, the second in a 3–1 away win over Crystal Palace. His third goal of the campaign came on 13 December, where he scored a penalty to open the scoring in a 1–1 draw at home to West Ham United.

On 3 February 2015, Gómez netted another penalty in a 3–1 win at Fulham in an FA Cup fourth round replay. On 2 May, again from 12 yards, he scored once in each half as the Black Cats defeated Southampton 2–1 at the Stadium of Light. The following week, his shot was deflected in by Danny Graham to give the latter his first Sunderland goal, in a 2–0 away victory over Everton; still in that month, he was ruled out for the last three games of the season with a fractured kneecap.

In the last minutes of the 2016 winter transfer window, after making only six appearances in the first half of the season, Gómez was loaned to Championship club Blackburn Rovers until June. He scored in his debut on 6 February, helping to a 1–1 draw at Middlesbrough. Three weeks later he netted twice, including a last-minute winner from a 30-yard free kick in a 3–2 win against Milton Keynes Dons at Ewood Park.

Three clubs in two years
On 17 August 2016, Gómez rejoined Wigan Athletic on a one-year contract. He returned to Spain after nearly nine years on 31 January 2017, signing with Rayo Vallecano of the Segunda División.

Gómez moved to Bulgarian club Levski Sofia on 6 July 2017, on a two-year deal.

Omonia
On 16 August 2018, Gómez joined Omonia of the Cypriot First Division on a two-year contract. Already as team captain, he agreed to extensions until 2021 and 2022.

Gómez team was leading the 2019–20 championship when the season was abandoned due to the COVID-19 pandemic; although they were not awarded the title, they did secure a place in the qualifying rounds of the UEFA Champions League.

The following campaign proved successful for team and player, as Gómez helped them qualify for the group stage of a European competition for the first time in history. On 29 October 2020, he scored a goal from inside his own half in a 2–1 home loss against PSV in the Europa League, breaking the record for the furthest distance for a goal ever scored in the competition. He ended the domestic league as a champion, Omonia's first in 11 years.

On 25 November 2021, Gómez scored again from inside his own half in the 89th minute of a 2–2 away draw at Qarabağ in the Europa Conference League. The following February, he suffered a ruptured knee ligament which kept him out of action for several months. He scored his last goal for the club on 5 January in the 1–1 away draw against Pafos, and in May it was announced that the 37-year-old would not be retained.

PAC Omonia 29M
In January 2023, Gomez joined PAC Omonia 29M.

Career statistics

Honours
Wigan Athletic
FA Cup: 2012–13

Omonia
Cypriot First Division: 2020–21
Cypriot Cup: 2021–22
Cypriot Super Cup: 2021

Individual
Football League Championship Team of the Year: 2008–09
Wigan Athletic Player of the Year: 2013–14

References

External links

Levski Sofia official profile

1985 births
Living people
Spanish footballers
Footballers from Barcelona
Association football midfielders
La Liga players
Segunda División players
Segunda División B players
Tercera División players
FC Barcelona C players
FC Barcelona Atlètic players
FC Barcelona players
RCD Espanyol B footballers
RCD Espanyol footballers
Rayo Vallecano players
Premier League players
English Football League players
Swansea City A.F.C. players
Wigan Athletic F.C. players
Sunderland A.F.C. players
Blackburn Rovers F.C. players
First Professional Football League (Bulgaria) players
PFC Levski Sofia players
Cypriot First Division players
Cypriot Second Division players
AC Omonia players
FA Cup Final players
Spain youth international footballers
Spanish expatriate footballers
Expatriate footballers in Wales
Expatriate footballers in England
Expatriate footballers in Bulgaria
Expatriate footballers in Cyprus
Spanish expatriate sportspeople in Wales
Spanish expatriate sportspeople in England
Spanish expatriate sportspeople in Bulgaria
Spanish expatriate sportspeople in Cyprus